Cast the first stone may refer to:

Cast the First Stone (Ensign album)
Cast the First Stone, an album by Ion Dissonance 
Jesus and the woman taken in adultery, a parable in which Jesus says, "Let he who is without sin cast the first stone"